II is the second album by American hard rock band, Hardline. It was released in 2002, ten years after the band's debut album Double Eclipse. It is also the last album to feature Joey Gioeli.

The album was originally going to be named Hyperspace, but vocalist Johnny Gioeli decided to change the name simply to II because "it's a natural prosecution of what we started with our debut album Double Eclipse." The tracks "Face the Night," "Do or Die," "Your Eyes," and "This Gift" were originally recorded for Double Eclipse, as Johnny Gioeli revealed in a 2002 interview, "So people are getting a real Hardline record."

It features former The Storm guitarist Josh Ramos.

In a 2002 interview with Andy Read, Johnny Gioeli revealed four songs that were to be included on II: "Plastic Jesus," "Sweet Surrender," "Why Me," which may have been an early demo of "Y," and "Only a Night," the only track among the four confirmed to have appeared on the final product. Gioeli also revealed that he had written two full-length albums, one of which was unused and replaced with what became II. "We actually started writing an album that would've truly been a follow-up to the first Hardline record," Gioeli explained, "It would have been a bit shocking because it was a little outside the box. People don't know that because the second album never came out. Anyway, people at Frontiers heard it and got a little bit nervous and said, 'Keep it like the first record.'"

In an interview with members of Jun Senoue's official fansite at Summer of Sonic 2012, Gioeli elaborated on the differences between Double Eclipse and what would have been an immediate follow up: "So the question is, how different was it going to be? Well, what happened was, we had a meeting with the record company (MCA Records) when we were preparing for that, and then, you know the whole Pearl Jam alternative shit was happening, and the record company said 'Hey look, we know that you guys are talented enough that you can fit in this space as well. So we want to have a bit of an alternative flare.' So, was it completely different? No, but it definitely had a little alternative feel to it. Yeah, it definitely did. I’m trying to recall... basically the difference was, what was happening is a lot of the singers were not using much vibrato." He then demonstrated the difference. "So what we were doing was..." He proceeded to sing part of “I Will Survive” (unreleased) without vibrato. "There it is, that was one of the songs."

Track listing

Personnel

Band members
Johnny Gioeli – vocals, executive producer
Josh Ramos – lead & rhythm guitar
Joey Gioeli – rhythm guitar
Bobby Rock – drums
Christopher Maloney – bass guitar
Michael T. Ross – keyboards

Additional musicians
Neal Schon - guitar (track 11)

Production
Bob Burch - producer, recording, engineering, mixing, arrangement
Andy Haller - recording, engineer, mixing
Gary Hoey - mixing
Mike S. Robinson - executive producer
Evren Göknar - mastering

External links
Heavy Harmonies page

Hardline (band) albums
2002 albums
Frontiers Records albums